"Lafayette (We Hear You Calling)" is a World War I song written and composed by Mary Earl, which was a pseudonym of Robert A. King. It was published in New York, New York by Shapiro, Bernstein, & Co. in 1918. The sheet music cover, illustrated by Albert Barbelle, depicts soldiers marching with fixed bayonets below a statue of Lafayette in silhouette.

References 

Bibliography
Parker, Bernard S. World War I Sheet Music 1. Jefferson: McFarland & Company, Inc., 2007. . 
Paas, John Roger. 2014. America sings of war: American sheet music from World War I. . 
Vogel, Frederick G. World War I Songs: A History and Dictionary of Popular American Patriotic Tunes, with Over 300 Complete Lyrics. Jefferson: McFarland & Company, Inc., 1995. . 

1918 songs
Songs about military officers
Songs of World War I
Cultural depictions of Gilbert du Motier, Marquis de Lafayette
Songs written by Robert A. King (composer)